Patterson Island is one of the uninhabited Canadian arctic islands in Nunavut, Canada. It lies in the Arctic Ocean, south-east of Grosvenor Island. It is the most southerly island of the Findlay Group.

Another Patterson Island lies in Ungava Bay, part of the Hopewell Islands, just across from Inukjuak. The Algerine Channel separates it from Harrison Island. It has roughly the same area as the first one but is much more elongated in shape.

External links
 Patterson Island in the Atlas of Canada - Toporama; Natural Resources Canada
 Patterson Island (Ungava) in the Atlas of Canada - Toporama; Natural Resources Canada

Islands of the Queen Elizabeth Islands
Uninhabited islands of Qikiqtaaluk Region